The Lise Meitner Lectures (LML) are a series of public lectures in honour of Lise Meitner. The lectures are organized jointly by the German Physical Society and the Austrian Physical Society, with the intention to showcase outstanding female scientists in physics or related fields. The annual lecture series was launched in 2008, when Lise Meitner's birthday celebrated its 130th anniversary. In October 2008, the Lise Meitner Lecture was held in Vienna and Berlin with an accompanying exhibition. The annual lecture series not only aims at increasing the visibility of successful female researchers, but also at encouraging girls and young women towards careers in physics.

Awardees
 2021: Claudia Draxl, "Quantum-based Materials Modeling and Artificial Intelligence for Tackling Societal Challenges"
 2019: Halina Rubinsztein-Dunlop, "Sculpted light in nano- and microsystems"
 2017/18: Nicola Spaldin, "New materials for a new age" (DPG 2018/ÖPG 2017)
 2017/18: Johanna Stachel, "Erforschung von Urknallmaterie an der Weltmaschine LHC" (DPG 2017/ÖPG 2018)
 2016: Petra Schwille, "Ist Leben konstruierbar?"
 2015: Cornelia Denz, "Material in neuem Licht - wie maßgeschneidertes Licht Materie strukturieren und anordnen kann"
 2014: Felicitas Pauss, "Das Higgs-Teilchen: Unsichtbares sichtbar und Unmögliches möglich machen"
 2013: Jocelyn Bell Burnell, "Pulsars and extreme physics"
 2012: Renate Loll, "More than meets the eye: probing the Planckian structure of spacetime"
 2010: Anna Frebel, "Die ältesten Sterne im Universum und die chemische Entwicklung unserer Galaxie"
 2009: Cecilia Jarlskog, "Symmetries – exact and broken"
 2008: Mildred Dresselhaus, "Why are we so excited about nano-carbons?"

References

External links 
 Lise-Meitner-Lectures featured by the German Physical Society
 Lise-Meitner-Lectures featured by the Austrian Physical Society
Dates of the Lise-Meitner-Lecture
 Exhibition catalog Lise Meitner Lecture 2008

Science awards honoring women